Kings Hill Pass is part of the Kings Hill Scenic Byway which passes through the Little Belt Mountains in the Lewis and Clark National Forest in Montana, United States.  The route is home to a wide variety of wildlife and provides many recreational opportunities for travelers on the route. The Byway is a 71-mile route that begins on U.S. Highway 89 at its junction with U.S. Highway 12. From the junction the Byway travels north through the Lewis and Clark National Forest through the communities of Neihart and Monarch Montana and on to its junction with U.S. Highway 87. The route offers access to the ski area at Showdown, Montana and Sluice Boxes State Park. The route travels over the Kings Hill Pass near Monarch Montana which snow removal crews work to keep open throughout the winter season. Kings Hill Pass is at an elevation of 7,393 feet. There is an observation tower that offers views of the Lewis and Clark National Forest that is popular with visitors.

See also
 Mountain passes in Montana

Notes

U.S. Highways in Montana
Mountain passes of Montana
Landforms of Meagher County, Montana
Landforms of Cascade County, Montana
U.S. Route 89